Festuca pallens, the blue fescue, is a species of grass.

References

pallens